Brighton Energy Co-operative is a co-operative based in Brighton, England that operates over 60 solar arrays in the city and surrounding area.

Founded in 2010 the co-operative has raised £1.9m investments from 500+ members through community share issues to fund the installation of the plants.

The arrays range from  As well as dedicated sites, the co-operative has also installed solar panels on buildings in the area, including private businesses and some schools.

References 

Co-operatives in the United Kingdom
Community electricity generation in the United Kingdom
Energy cooperatives